This article includes a list of Canadian ambassadors to the Federal Republic of Germany.

History

Canada had no diplomatic mission to Germany before the Second World War, though it had immigration agents in the country as early as 1872, when Wilhelm Hespeler was sent to Berlin as the Dominion of Canada's official immigration agent for several months. German laws from before the First World War against the solicitation of emigrants delayed the establishment of a permanent immigration office by Canada until 1923. W.G. Fisher was appointed as Canada's first trade commissioner to Germany in 1910, with an office in Hamburg, which relocated to Berlin before closing in 1914 for the duration of the war. The Hamburg trade office was re-opened in 1922 with Leolyn Dana Wilgress as trade commissioner. It again moved to Berlin in 1938, and both it and the immigration office were closed in 1939 during the Second World War. In 1946, after the end of the war, a trade office was established in Frankfurt, and various immigration offices were also established.

In January 1946, the Canadian government established the Canadian Military Mission to the Allied Control Council in Berlin and appointed Lt.-Gen. Maurice Pope, who was responsible both to the Department of External Affairs and the Department of National Defence, as its first head.

By order-in-council, the Canadian government decided, on November 22, 1949, to establish a diplomatic mission in Bonn, the capital of the new Federal Republic of Germany (West Germany). The mission operated under the auspices of the Canadian Military Mission to the Allied Control Council until July 10, 1951, when the Canadian mission in Bonn was upgraded to an embassy with Thomas Clayton Davis as Canada's first Ambassador to West Germany. Canada established diplomatic relations with the German Democratic Republic (East Germany) on August 1, 1975, but never opened an embassy. Instead, Canada's Ambassador to Poland based in Warsaw was accredited as Ambassador to the German Democratic Republic from 1976 until 1990, when the GDR was dissolved and united with West Germany. In 1999, the Canadian Embassy moved from Bonn to Berlin as a result of Germany relocating the seat of government to that city in the same year.

List of ambassadors

See also
Canada–Germany relations
Canada House (Berlin)

References

External links
 Official website

Germany
 
 
Canada